Crustless bread is bread without crusts. Panko is made from such a bread, which is produced by passing an electric current through the dough.
The British food group RHM manufactures a crustless bread targeted at children called Hovis Invisible Crust, which is produced by baking the bread at low temperature. Other bread manufacturers have released crustless bread, with the crusts removed.

Measurable nutritional loss can result from omitting crusts from bread.

See also 
 List of breads

References 

Breads